Tsho Rolpa (also Cho Rolpa) is one of the biggest glacial lakes in Nepal.

Tsho Rolpa (also Cho Rolpa)

Flooding

The lake threatens to burst through its unstable dam, which would threaten the lives and livestock of over 6000 villagers living around the Tamakoshi River. In 2012, the UNDP reported that an early warning system installed by the authorities in the late 1990s, which became defunct through lack of maintenance, will be replaced by a more modern warning system for glacial floods from the lake.

References

Lakes of Bagmati Province
Glacial lakes of Nepal
Himalayas
Dolakha District